Tui Ātua Tupua Tamasese Tupuola Tufuga Efi (born Olaf "Efi" Tamasese; 1 March 1938) is a Samoan political leader and as holder of the maximal lineage Tama-a-'āiga title of Tupua Tamasese, is one of the four paramount chiefs of Samoa. He also holds the royal pāpā title of Tui Atua ('sovereign' of Atua).

Tui Ātua served as the third prime minister of Samoa from 1976 to 1982 and again later in 1982. On 16 June 2007, he was elected as Samoa's Head of State (O le Ao Mamalu o le Malo) from 2007 to 2017. He was sworn in at Samoa's Parliament (Maota Fono) on 20 June 2007.

Personal life
Tupua was born on 1 March 1938 at Moto'otua in Samoa. He is the son of Samoa's first co-Head of State, O le Ao Mamalu o le Malo Tupua Tamasese Meaʻole (1905–1963) and Irene Gustava Noue Nelson, of Samoan, Swedish and British descent. He is also the nephew of Samoa's celebrated independence movement leader, Tupua Tamasese Lealofi III and the cousin of the nation's second Prime Minister, Tupua Tamasese Lealofi IV.

Tupua attended primary school at the Marist Brothers School at Mulivai in the Samoan capital of Apia.  He continued his education at St. Patrick's College in Silverstream, Wellington, New Zealand. He was also educated at Victoria University of Wellington, in New Zealand's capital city.

Tupua is married to Masiofo Filifilia Imo, who is also known as Masiofo Filifilia Tamasese.

Prime Minister of Samoa
Tupua began his political career in May 1965, when he was elected to the Legislative Assembly from the Vaisigano No. 1 constituency. He served as Samoa's Minister of Works from 1970 until 1972.

Tupua served as prime minister for two consecutive terms from 1976 to 1982. He also served as deputy prime minister from 1985 to 1988. It was during his second term as Prime Minister that the Public Service Association went on a general strike in 1981, paralysing the country for several months and paving the way for the opposition Human Rights Protection Party's entry to government in 1982. The party would go on to hold power until 2021.

Tupua became Leader of the Opposition following his Christian Democratic Party's election defeat in 1982. He also headed the Samoan National Development Party.  He continued to serve Anoama'a East as MP until 2004 when he became one of the two members of Samoa's Council of Deputies along with Tuimaleali'ifano Va'aletoa Sualauvi II. Both Efi and Va'aletoa served as temporary acting heads of state (O le Ao o le Malo) following the death of Malietoa Tanumafili II in May 2007.

Head of State - "O le Ao Mamalu o le Malo."
On 11 May 2007, following the death of Malietoa Tanumafili II, Samoa's head of state since independence in 1962, Tupua became one of the two acting heads of state alongside Tuimaleali'ifano Va'aleto'a Sualauvi II. Tupua was elected Head of state on 16 June 2007. His was the only nomination put forth in Samoa's Fono (parliament) and thus the decision was unanimous. His election was welcomed by many Samoans both in Samoa and abroad. He was sworn into office on 20 June 2007.

He was re-elected in July 2012 by a majority vote of the Legislative Assembly. However, he was not re-appointed as of 20 July 2017 after a controversial move by the Prime Minister which saw a legislative assembly vote of 23 to 15. This was after an initial vote that was taken, which saw the Tama-a-'āiga gain the majority of support from the ruling HRPP caucus. This was seen as but a mere formality and that Tui Ātua would again be elected to office to serve as Head of State. However, owing to decades of tension with the then Prime Minister Tuila'epa Sa'ilele Malielegaoi, Tui Ātua was instead replaced in a backroom vote by another Tama-a-'āiga, Tuimaleali'ifano Va'aleto'a Sualauvi II.

Academia
Tupua held a number of academic positions during and after his political career as an MP and Prime Minister.

Tupua served as an adjunct professor for Te Whare Wananga o Awanuiarangi in New Zealand. He later became an Associate Member of the Matahauariki Institute at Waikato University. He was a PhD examiner at Australian National University in Canberra for Pacific and Samoan history.

Tupua was a resident scholar of the Pacific Studies Centre of the Australian National University and the Macmillan Brown Centre for Pacific Studies at University of Canterbury in New Zealand.

Tupua helped to begin excavations at Samoa's important Pulemelei Mound archaeological site. Samoans, under Tupua Tamasese, carried out a ceremony to honour Thor Heyerdahl for his contributions to Polynesia and the Pulemelei Mound excavations in 2003.

In late 2007 Tupua established an overseas boarding school scholarship to St. Patrick's College, Silverstream, which allows one student per year to live and be schooled in New Zealand for all their college years, beginning in 2008.

Tupua was awarded an honorary doctorate by St Andrew's University in 2019.

Publications
Tupua wrote three books, and articles in scholarly journals and publications.

Titles and honours
He holds the following titles:

 Tui Atua pāpā title of Atua. One of the 4 Tafa'ifa (sovereign) titles of Samoa, bestowed by the faleono of Lufilufi.
Tupua Tamasese Tama-a-‘Āiga title of Sā Tupua, one of the 4 Tama-a-'āiga titles and 2 royal lineages of Samoa. The title is held and bestowed by its heirs and custodians - Aiga Sā Fenunivao of Falefa and Salani.

In July 2008 while attending the coronation of George Tupou V of Tonga he was made a Knight grand Cross with Collar of the Order of the Crown of Tonga.

Controversy 
Upon Tupua Tamasese Lealofi IV's death in 1983, the question as to a successor was raised with Tupuola Efi staking his claim. However, this would require 'Āiga Sā Fenunuivao agreeing to his appointment. Salani agreed however, Falefa and Lufilufi opposed it. Tupuola Efi proceeded without the unanimous support of Āiga Sā Fenunuivao. On the morning of his installation ceremony at Vaimoso, the nation's public broadcaster, Radio 2AP, read an announcement from the Moeono at the time, Moeono Alai'asā Kolio, notifying the country that 'Āiga Sā Fenunuivao as well as the leaders of Lufilufi - the traditional seat of the Tupua Tamasese title - had not sanctioned Tufuga Efi's ascension to the title, effectively nullifying the candidate's grasp for the title once again.

In 1986, Tupuola Efi sought out Āiga Sā Fenunuivao's blessing. Falefa and Lufilufi eventually agreed to Tupuola Tufuga Efi's ascension to the titles. 'Āiga Sā Fenunuivao joined with 'Āiga o Mavaega and 'Āiga Sā Tuala to jointly conferred the Tupua Tamasese title on Tupuola Efi in an installation ceremony at Vaimoso in November, 1986, jointly registering the title under their family names.

However, the right of joint conferral was later challenged in court. In 1987, the court ruled that the right of conferral of the Tupua Tamasese title belonged exclusively to 'Āiga Sā Fenunuivao of Falefa and Salani, based on the customary criteria of descent, relevant knowledge and skill, residence and service.

Ancestry

See also
Fa'amatai, the chiefly system of Samoa
Legislative Assembly of Samoa

References

1938 births
Children of national leaders
Christian Democratic Party (Samoa) politicians
Living people
Members of the Legislative Assembly of Samoa
O le Ao o le Malo of Samoa
People educated at St. Patrick's College, Silverstream
Prime Ministers of Samoa
Deputy Prime Ministers of Samoa
Foreign ministers of Samoa
Members of the Council of Deputies
Samoan chiefs
Samoan National Development Party politicians
Samoan people of English descent
Samoan people of Irish descent
Samoan people of Swedish descent
Samoan Roman Catholics
Victoria University of Wellington alumni
Knights Grand Cross of the Order of the Crown of Tonga
20th-century Samoan politicians
21st-century Samoan politicians